Atsu Nyamadi (born 1 June 1994, in Anloga) is a Ghanaian athlete competing in the decathlon. He won medals at the 2014 African Championships and 2015 African Games.

His personal best in the event is 7567 points set in Eugene in 2015. This is the current national record.

Competition record

Personal bests
Outdoor
100 metres – 11.12 (+1.3 m/s) (Eugene 2016)
400 metres – 49.76 (Murfreesboro 2016)
1500 metres – 3:56.33 (Porto Novo 2012)
110 metres hurdles – 14.61 (+2.0 m/s) (Auburn 2016)
High jump – 2.01 (Murfreesboro 2016)
Pole vault – 4.40 (Charlottesville 2017)
Long jump – 7.62 (+1.7 m/s) (Charlottesville 2017)
Triple jump – 15.14 (Kumasi 2011)
Shot put – 14.49 (Gold Coast 2018)
Discus throw – 46.61 (Gold Coast 2018)
Javelin throw – 66.96 (Eugene 2016)
Decathlon – 7811 (Charlottesville 2017)
Indoor
60 metres – 7.10 (Birmingham 2016)
1000 metres – 2:45.93 (Birmingham 2016)
60 metres hurdles – 8.22 (Birmingham 2018)
High jump – 2.01 (Nashville 2015)
Pole vault – 4.29 (Birmingham 2017)
Long jump – 7.57 (Nashville 2016)
Triple jump – 15.04 (Murfreesboro 2014)
Shot put – 14.50 (Birmingham 2018)
Heptathlon – 5505 (Birmingham 2017)

References

1994 births
Living people
Ghanaian male athletes
Ghanaian decathletes
Athletes (track and field) at the 2010 Summer Youth Olympics
Athletes (track and field) at the 2014 Commonwealth Games
Athletes (track and field) at the 2018 Commonwealth Games
People from Volta Region
African Games silver medalists for Ghana
African Games medalists in athletics (track and field)
Athletes (track and field) at the 2015 African Games
Commonwealth Games competitors for Ghana
T.I. Ahmadiyya Senior High School (Kumasi) alumni